Pycnopodiidae is a family of echinoderms belonging to the order Forcipulatida.

Genera:
 Lysastrosoma Fisher, 1922
 Pycnopodia Stimpson, 1862

References

Forcipulatida
Echinoderm families